Juliette Paxton Atkinson Buxton (née Atkinson; April 15, 1873 – January 12, 1944) was an American tennis player. She was born in Rahway, New Jersey, United States.

Biography
Atkinson was the daughter of a Brooklyn, New York physician.  She won five U.S. Championships doubles titles in a row with three different partners. Both natives of Maplewood, New Jersey, she and her sister Kathleen Atkinson partnered to win the last two titles. Also the sisters twice faced each other in the semifinals of the singles competition. She won three mixed doubles titles with Edwin P. Fischer.

In both 1899 and 1901, Atkinson won the doubles title and reached the singles final at the tournament now known as the Cincinnati Masters. She won the 1899 doubles title with Myrtle McAteer (falling to McAteer that year in the singles final) and the 1901 doubles title with Marion Jones Farquhar (falling in the singles final to Winona Closterman).

In 1896 and 1898, she won the Niagara International Tennis Tournament. She won the Canadian Championships three times in a row, 1896, 1897 and 1898.

In 1918, she married George B. Buxton and had no children.

She was inducted into the International Tennis Hall of Fame in 1974.

Grand Slam finals

Singles (3 titles, 1 runner-up)

Doubles (7 titles)

Mixed doubles (3 titles)

References

External links
 

19th-century American women
19th-century female tennis players
American female tennis players
International Tennis Hall of Fame inductees
People from Maplewood, New Jersey
Sportspeople from Rahway, New Jersey
Tennis people from New Jersey
United States National champions (tennis)
1873 births
1944 deaths
Grand Slam (tennis) champions in women's singles
Grand Slam (tennis) champions in women's doubles
Grand Slam (tennis) champions in mixed doubles